Tucumán is a train station in the city of San Miguel de Tucumán of Tucumán Province, Argentina.

The station was originally built and operated by the Córdoba Central Railway and then added to Belgrano Railway network. Nowadays the station is only used for freight services, being operated by state-owned company Trenes Argentinos Cargas .

History 
The Córdoba Central Railway was founded in 1887 to take over a concession, originally granted to William Temple in 1885, for the construction of a 206 km line, from the Córdoba city suburb of Alta Córdoba to San Francisco. In October 1887 the Government granted the operation of Ferrocarril Central Norte's 884 km line (that included the Alta Córdoba-Tucumán, Frías-Santiago del Estero and Recreo-Chubicha branches) to Hume Hnos. & Cía (owned by The Hume Brothers) for $ 16,000,000.

The Tucumán CC station was the first railway station in the province, placed on the corner of San Martín and Marco Avellaneda streets, being designed by French architect Clodomiro Hidelet and opened to public in October 1876.

After the entire railway network was nationalised during Juan Perón's administration, the station started to be operated by recently formed Ferrocarriles Argentinos. The station remained active as an intermediate stop for trains run by Belgrano Railway to La Quiaca in Jujuy Province. The other station in the city for passenger trains was Tucumán N. (for Central Northern Railway, also transferred to Belgrano Railway in 1948).

In early 1990s, when the Carlos Menem's administration privatised all the railway services, the Belgrano Railway freight service remained under the control of the state due to lack of interest from private inversors. Nevertheless, the railway would be granted to Belgrano Cargas S.A., a consortium established by railway union "Unión Ferroviaria" in 1999. On the other hand, all the long-distance passenger services were closed in March 1993 so the station has remained active for freight trains exclusively since then.

In 2008, the Government of Argentina ceased the concession granted to Belgrano Cargas S.A. to operate the 7,347 km. of Belgrano Railway's freight network. A new company, "Belgrano Cargas y Logística", was established in May 2013 by National decree, to take over Belgrano's freight services, formerly operated by Belgrano Cargas. In June that same year the company also took over some services from Urquiza (2,704 km) and San Martín (5,254 km) railways.

The station building was remodeled in 2009, after a project to bring back a service between San Miguel de Tucumán and Tafí Viejo, although it was never reestablished.

Operators 

Notes

References

External links

 Trenes Argentinos Cargas, operator

Railway stations in Argentina
Railway stations opened in 1876